Isidoro Armijo (born February 15, 1871), also known as "Sunny Jim Sherman", was a Mexican American author, land agent, county clerk, and teacher. He is a man of many hats and was well loved in his county. Well known for his story “Sesenta minutos en los infiernos” which was also translated in English. He died in 1949 in New Mexico, United States of America.

Family 
Born in 1871 to Mexican elite parents, Hon. Jacinto Armijo and Senora Dona Juanita Silva. Isidoro Armijo, named after his grandfather, whose name was  Isidro Armijo. Isidoro Armijo was the oldest of four brothers (Catarino, Max, Jacinto, Henry) and two sisters (Josephine and Jennie).

On January 18, 1901, Isidoro Armijo married Jennie Archibald. She was an accomplished young woman from the Centennial state of Colorado. He also had one daughter named Ernestina Allice Evermon and a son named Willard who was born in 1908. She was born on the 9th of April 1904 in the U.S. within a New Mexico dwelling.

Nationality 
Mexican American. Said to be a Neo-Mexicano meaning the Hispanos of New Mexico.

Famous relatives 
Jacinto Armijo was born on the 13th of Aug 1845 in Socorro, New Mexico, USA and grew up to be an attorney and territorial legislator. Isidoro Armijo's grandparents (Don Isidoro Armijo and Dona Catarina Montoya de Armijo) were among the first colonists to settle Dona Ana county. When Jacinto was three his family moved to Las Cruces. Jacinto Armijo was well educated and became a prominent political leader as well as a probate judge.

Opportunities 
Isidoro Armijo had a class advantage resulting from his parents being participants of the Mexican elite. That advantage funded and influenced his ability to attend college and having connections to get into politics as well as the judicial system in New Mexico. From an early age you would see Isidoro accompanying his father and Hon. Tranquilino and Col. J. Francisco on their trip across the territory. According to the Santa Fe Newspaper, “Chief Clerk Armijo says (Isidoro Amijo) looking a gentleman and a scholar, actually in a trance, spellbound, absorbing, like a sponge, taking all in.”  Many of Isidoro Armijo's accomplishments would have been difficult to achieve if his father had not already had strong ties with those in the New Mexico community.

Schooling 
Armijo graduated from the College of Agriculture and Mechanical Arts. This college is now known as New Mexico State University. As founded in 1888, the headquarters are in Las Cruces, New Mexico.

Occupation 

Isidoro Armijo had various occupations, such as becoming a county clerk, chairman for the board of Education, land agent, teacher, and writer. Following college Armijo accepted a position at Puebla, Mexico where he spent three years as a court interpreter. In 1898 Armijo established El Progresso, a newspaper in Trinidad, Colorado. Soon after working as teacher in New Mexico, he began working as a newspaper writer in Las Cruces. Furthermore, he participated in traveling much of the United States and Mexico, Armjio became an active member of his state's politics. From 1902 to 1911, he was Probate Clerk for Dona Ana County, New Mexico. Soon after he was an editor of El Eco del Valle from 1900 to 1904. From 1904 to 1908 he edited La Flor del Valle. In 1910, he was appointed as a member of the New Mexico Constitutional Convention. On the list of the “Delegates to the Constitutional Convention of 1910” Isidoro Armijo is listed as the delegate for Dona Ana County and labeled a Republican. In 1914 he served a term in the House of Representatives for New Mexico. At a later point, he returned to journalism.

Obstacles 
According to a New Mexico Newspaper article, “Life has not been all ice cream and pie for the Dona Ana county delegate”. Armijo had done a raid on the land holdings which created concern for those in Austin. This resulted in 600,00 acres worth $60,000,000 being added to the domain of the state of New Mexico.

Well liked 
Isidoro Armijo had the largest number of votes cast in his county for any candidate. He was well known throughout New Mexico and was popular among the people of his county.

Well known for 
Armijo is well known for his story “Sesenta minutos en los infiernos” which was originally published in the newspaper El Eco del Valle in 1911. This story was later translated and published in 1924 as “Sixty Minutes in Hades” in Laughing Horse magazine. This story is about a woman who leaves her husband for her boyfriend leaving a letter behind depicting her feelings and loss of love for her husband. The woman later rushes home to try to undo what she had done only to find her husband writing a suicide letter with a gun in his hand. The story ends in a positive note with the husband and wife staying together.

La Revista de Taos 
This newspaper was also known as “Taos Valley News”. Was a weekly newspaper that was based in Taos, New Mexico. The dates of publication were from 1905 to 1922. This newspaper provided material primarily utilizing the Spanish language while supported the Republican Party. The paper supported the Republican party until it changed to an independent weekly. The motto of the newspaper was “A Liberal and Independent Journal, of the People, for the People, and by the People”. Isidoro Armijo was the business manager and the managing editor.

References 

American people of Mexican descent